Tonan Maebashi is a Japanese football club based in Maebashi city, Gunma Prefecture. They play in the 2nd division of the Kantō Soccer League.

Squad

References

External links
Official site

Football clubs in Japan
Sports teams in Gunma Prefecture
Association football clubs established in 1982
1982 establishments in Japan
Maebashi